Dário Berger (born December 7, 1956) is a Brazilian politician. He has represented Santa Catarina in the Federal Senate since 2015. Previously, he was mayor of Florianópolis from 2005 to 2012. He is a member of the Brazilian Democratic Movement Party.

Berger has been repeatedly accused of corruption. While mayor of São José, Santa Catarina he was fined for several financial irregularities during the construction of a highway. He also faced criticism when he awarded South Stage Events LTDA a contract to build a big Christmas tree in the center of São Jose without a fair bidding process. Despite this, he was part of a Senate committee to investigate President Dilma Rousseff’s alleged tampering of fiscal data.

See also
 List of mayors of Florianópolis

References

|-

Living people
1956 births
People from Santa Catarina (state)
Brazilian Socialist Party politicians
Members of the Federal Senate (Brazil)